James Henry Dimmock (5 December 1900 – 23 December 1972) was a footballer who scored the winning goal for Tottenham Hotspur in the 1921 FA Cup Final. He played as an outside left and became the fans' favourite with his mazy runs and trickery, and also won three caps for England.

Early years
Dimmock was born in Edmonton on 5 December 1900 where he attended Montague Rd School. He played junior football for Park Avenue and Gothic Works before signing as an amateur for Tottenham Hotspur in 1916. During the First World War, he played for Clapton Orient and Edmonton Ramblers. Dimmock served as a gunner in the First World War with the Royal Field Artillery.

Professional career
Dimmock turned professional with Tottenham Hotspur in May 1919, and his first match was at Lincoln City on 4 October.

He holds a unique place in the history of Tottenham Hotspur by being the only player in the club's history to play 400 league games and score 100 league goals. He also remains (at 20 years 139 days) the youngest Tottenham player to appear in an FA Cup Final.

Undoubtedly his most memorable season was the 1920–21 season. Dimmock made his international debut against Scotland on 9 April 1921 at the age of 20 years and 125 days to become the youngest Spurs player (at that time) to play for England, and a fortnight later he appeared for Spurs in the FA Cup Final against Wolverhampton Wanderers at Stamford Bridge. Despite sustaining an injury early in the game, he scored the only goal of the game to secure a second FA Cup triumph for Tottenham. Surprisingly, he had to wait five years to gain his 2 further international caps, against Wales and Belgium in 1926.

When he was released by Spurs in 1931 he had scored 100 goals in 400 league games, and 12 in 38 FA Cup matches.

He subsequently played one season for Thames Association FC and two seasons for Clapton Orient.

Later years
In 1934, he played for Ashford Town (Kent) in the Kent League. In the same year he had a trial with Tunbridge Wells Rangers before retiring from the game in 1936.

He worked for a time in the road haulage industry but suffered from poor health later in life, eventually losing both legs. He died on 23 December 1972 at the North Middlesex Hospital, Edmonton, London.

Career statistics

International

Honours 
Tottenham Hotspur
FA Cup: 1920–21

References

External links
  Hall of fame
 1921 FA Cup Final
 Jimmy Dimmock fact-file

1900 births
1972 deaths
Footballers from Edmonton, London
Association football outside forwards
English footballers
England international footballers
Tottenham Hotspur F.C. players
Thames A.F.C. players
Ashford United F.C. players
Leyton Orient F.C. players
Tunbridge Wells F.C. players
English Football League players
British Army personnel of World War I
Royal Field Artillery soldiers
FA Cup Final players
Kent Football League (1894–1959) players